+1 is the fourth album by Japanese pop singer Kaela Kimura, released on April 2, 2008.

Track listing

References

2008 albums
Kaela Kimura albums
Columbia Records albums
Japanese-language albums